Haiti competed at the 1924 Summer Olympics in Paris, France. The country's delegation consisted of two officials and eleven competitors. Of the competitors, four were track and field athletes, and seven were shooters. One of the athletes and two of the shooters ended up not competing in any events. The two officials in the delegation were V. Pasquet and the Secretary-General of the Haitian Olympic Committee, Henec Dorsinville. Haiti won its first Olympic medal at these Games, a bronze in the men's team free rifle event.

Medalists

Athletics

Shooting

In sport shooting competed seven young members of the Gendarmerie Port-au-Prince, trained by their head, the US-American Col. Douglas C. McDougal, serving from 1921 to 1925 at Port-au-Prince.

References
International Olympic Committee results database

Nations at the 1924 Summer Olympics
1924
Olympics